The word ekphrasis, or ecphrasis, comes from the Greek for the written description of a work of art produced as a rhetorical or literary exercise, often used in the adjectival form ekphrastic. It is a vivid, often dramatic, verbal description of a visual work of art, either real or imagined. Thus, "an ekphrastic poem is a vivid description of a scene or, more commonly, a work of art." In ancient times, it might refer more broadly to a description of any thing, person, or experience. The word comes from the Greek ἐκ ek and φράσις phrásis, 'out' and 'speak' respectively, and the verb ἐκφράζειν ekphrázein, 'to proclaim or call an inanimate object by name'.

The works of art described or evoked, may be real or imagined; and this may be difficult to discern. Ancient ekphrastic writing can be useful evidence for art historians, especially for paintings, as virtually no original Greco-Roman examples survive. 

Ekphrasis has been considered generally to be a rhetorical device in which one medium of art tries to relate to another medium by defining and describing its essence and form, and in doing so, relate more directly to the audience, through its illuminative liveliness.

A descriptive work of prose or poetry, a film, or even a photograph may highlight through its rhetorical vividness what is happening or what is shown. For example, in the visual arts, it may enhance the original art and so take on a life of its own through its brilliant description. One example is a painting of a sculpture: the painting is "telling the story of" the sculpture, and so becoming a storyteller, as well as a story (work of art) itself. Virtually any type of artistic medium may be the actor of or subject of ekphrasis. Although, for example, it may not be possible to make an accurate sculpture of a book to retell the story in an authentic way, it is the spirit of the book that may be conveyed by virtually any medium and thereby enhance the artistic impact of the original book through synergy.

History

Plato's forms, the beginning of ekphrasis 
In the Republic, Book X, Plato discusses forms by using real things, such as a bed, for example, and calls each way a bed has been made, a "bedness". He commences with the original form of a bed, one of a variety of ways a bed may have been constructed by a craftsman and compares that form with an ideal form of a bed, of a perfect archetype or image in the form of which beds ought to be made, in short, the epitome of bedness.

In his analogy, one bedness form shares its own bedness – with all its shortcomings – with that of the ideal form, or template. A third bedness, too, may share the ideal form. He continues with the fourth form also containing elements of the ideal template or archetype which in this way remains an ever-present and invisible ideal version with which the craftsman compares his work. As bedness after bedness shares the ideal form and template of all creation of beds, and each bedness is associated with another ad infinitum, it is called an "infinite regress of forms".

From form to ekphrasis 
It was this epitome, this template of the ideal form, that a craftsman or later an artist would try to reconstruct in his attempt to achieve perfection in his work, that was to manifest itself in ekphrasis at a later stage.

Artists began to use their own literary and artistic genre of art to work and reflect on another art to illuminate what the eye might not see in the original, to elevate it and possibly even surpass it.

Plato and Aristotle 
For Plato (and Aristotle), it is not so much the form of each bed that defines bedness as the mimetic stages at which beds may be viewed that defines bedness. 
 a bed as a physical entity is a mere form of bed
 any view from whichever perspective, be it a side elevation, a full panoramic view from above, or looking at a bed end-on is at a second remove
 a full picture, characterizing the whole bed is at a third remove
 ekphrasis of a bed in another art form is at a fourth remove

Socrates and Phaedrus 
In another instance, Socrates talks about ekphrasis to Phaedrus thus:
"You know, Phaedrus, that is the strange thing about writing,
which makes it truly correspond to painting.
The painter's products stand before us as though they were alive,
but if you question them, they maintain a most majestic silence.
It is the same with written words; they seem to talk
to you as if they were intelligent, but if you ask them anything
about what they say, from a desire to be instructed,
they go on telling you just the same thing forever".

Genre

In literature 
The fullest example of ekphrasis in antiquity can be found in Philostratus of Lemnos' Eikones which describes 64 pictures in a Neapolitan villa. Modern critics have debated as to whether the paintings described should be considered as real or imagined, or the reader left uncertain. Ekphrasis is described in Aphthonius' Progymnasmata, his textbook of style, and later classical literary and rhetorical textbooks, and with other classical literary techniques. It was keenly revived in the Renaissance.

In the Middle Ages, ekphrasis was less often practiced, especially regarding real objects. Historians of medieval art have complained that the accounts of monastic chronicles recording now vanished art concentrate on objects made from valuable materials or with the status of relics. They rarely give more than the cost and weight of objects, and perhaps a mention of the subject matter of the iconography.

The Renaissance and Baroque periods made much use of ekphrasis, typically mainly of imagined works. In Renaissance Italy, Canto 33 of Ariosto's Orlando Furioso describes a picture gallery created by Merlin. In Spain, Lope de Vega often used allusions and descriptions of Italian art in his plays, and included the painter Titian as one of his characters. Calderón de la Barca also incorporated works of art in dramas such as The Painter of his Dishonor. Miguel de Cervantes, who spent his youth in Italy, used many Renaissance frescoes and paintings in Don Quixote and many of his other works. In England, Shakespeare briefly describes a group of erotic paintings in Cymbeline, but his most extended exercise is a 200-line description of the Greek army before Troy in The Rape of Lucrece. Ekphrasis seems to have been less common in France during these periods.

Instances of ekphrasis in 19th century literature can be found in the works of such influential figures as Spanish novelist Benito Pérez Galdós, French poet, painter and novelist Théophile Gautier, Norwegian playwright Henrik Ibsen, and Russian novelist Fyodor Dostoyevsky.

Herman Melville's Moby Dick, or The Whale features an intense use of ekphrasis as a stylistic manifesto of the book in which it appears. In the chapter "The Spouter Inn", a painting hanging on the wall of a whaler's inn is described as irreconcilably unclear, over scrawled with smoke and defacements. The narrator, so-called Ishmael, describes how this painting can be both lacking any definition and still provoking in the viewer dozens of distinct possible understandings, until the great mass of interpretations resolves into a Whale. This grounds all the interpretations while containing them, an indication of how Melville sees his own book unfolding around this chapter.

In Pérez Galdós's Our Friend Manso (1882), the narrator describes two paintings by Théodore Géricault to point to the shipwreck of ideals; while in La incógnita (1889), there are many allusions and descriptions of Italian art, including references to Botticelli, Mantegna, Masaccio, Raphael, Titian, etc.

In Ibsen's 1888 work The Lady from the Sea, the first act begins with the description of a painting of a mermaid dying on the shore and is followed by a description of a sculpture that depicts a woman having a nightmare of an ex-lover returning to her. Both works of art can be interpreted as having much importance in the overall meaning of the play as protagonist Ellida Wangel both yearns for her lost youth spent on an island out at sea and is later in the play visited by a lover she thought dead. Furthermore, as an interesting example of the back-and-forth dynamic that exists between literary ekphrasis and art, in 1896 (eight years after the play was written) Norwegian painter Edvard Munch painted an image similar to the one described by Ibsen in a painting he also entitled Lady from the Sea. Ibsen's last work When We Dead Awaken also contains examples of ekphrasis as the play's protagonist, Arnold Rubek, is a sculptor. Several times throughout the play he describes his masterpiece "Resurrection Day" at length and in the many different forms the sculpture took throughout the stages of its creation. Once again the evolution of the sculpture as described in the play can be read as a reflection on the transformation undergone by Rubek himself and even as a statement on the progression Ibsen's own plays took. Many scholars have read this final play (stated by Ibsen himself to be an 'epilogue') as the playwright's reflection on his own work as an artist.

The Russian novelist Fyodor Dostoyevsky employed ekphrasis most notably in his novel The Idiot. In this novel, the protagonist, Prince Myshkin, sees a painting of a dead Christ in the house of Rogozhin that has a profound effect on him.  Later in the novel, another character, Hippolite, describes the painting at much length depicting the image of Christ as one of brutal realism that lacks any beauty or sense of the divine. Rogozhin, who is himself the owner of the painting, at one moment says that the painting has the power to take away a man's faith. This is a comment that Dostoyevsky himself made to his wife Anna upon seeing the actual painting that the painting in the novel is based on, The Body of the Dead Christ in the Tomb by Hans Holbein. The painting was seen shortly before Dostoyevsky began the novel. Though this is the major instance of ekphrasis in the novel, and the one which has the most thematic importance to the story as a whole, other instances can be spotted when Prince Myshkin sees a painting of Swiss landscape that reminds him of a view he saw while at a sanatorium in Switzerland, and also when he first sees the face of his love interest, Nastasya, in the form of a painted portrait.  At one point in the novel, Nastasya, too, describes a painting of Christ, her own imaginary work that portrays Christ with a child, an image which naturally evokes comparison between the image of the dead Christ.

The Irish aesthete and novelist Oscar Wilde's The Picture of Dorian Gray (1890/1891) tells how Basil Hallward paints a picture of the young man named Dorian Gray. Dorian meets Lord Henry Wotton, who espouses a new hedonism, dedicated to the pursuit of beauty and all pleasures of the senses. Under his sway, Dorian bemoans the fact that his youth will soon fade. He would sell his soul so as to have the portrait age rather than himself. As Dorian engages in a debauched life, the gradual deterioration of the portrait becomes a mirror of his soul. There are repeated instances of notional ekphrasis of the deteriorating figure in the painting throughout the novel, although these are often partial, leaving much of the portrait's imagery to the imagination. The novel forms part of the magic portrait genre. Wilde had previously experimented with employing portraits in his written work, as in The Portrait of Mr. W. H. (1889).

Anthony Powell's novel sequence A Dance to the Music of Time begins with an evocation of the painting by Poussin which gives the sequence its name, and contains other passages of ekphrasis, perhaps influenced by the many passages in Marcel Proust's À la recherche du temps perdu.

In the 20th century, Roger Zelazny's "24 Views of Mt. Fuji, by Hokusai" uses an ekphrastic frame, descriptions of Hokusai's famous series of woodcuts, as a structural device for his story. In her novel Skyline the South African-Italian Patricia Schonstein concludes each chapter with an art curator’s description of a naïve work of art as a means of introducing additional narrative voices.

Ekphrastic poetry 

Ekphrastic poetry may be encountered as early as the days of Homer, whose Iliad (Book 18) describes the Shield of Achilles, with how Hephaestus made it as well as its completed shape. Famous later examples are found in Virgil's Aeneid, for instance the description of what Aeneas sees engraved on the doors of Carthage's temple of Juno, and Catullus 64, which contains an extended ekphrasis of an imaginary coverlet with the story of Ariadne picked out on it.

Ekphrastic poetry flourished in the Romantic era and again among the pre-Raphaelite poets. A major poem of the English Romantics – "Ode on a Grecian Urn" by John Keats – provides an example of the artistic potential of ekphrasis. The entire poem is a description of a piece of pottery that the narrator finds evocative. Felicia Hemans made extensive use of ekphrasis, as did Letitia Elizabeth Landon, especially in her Poetical Sketches of Modern Pictures. Dante Gabriel Rossetti's "double-works" exemplify the use of the genre by an artist mutually to enhance his visual and literary art. Rossetti also ekphrasized a number of paintings by other artists, generally from the Italian Renaissance, such as Leonardo da Vinci's Virgin of the Rocks.

Other examples of the genre from the nineteenth century include Michael Field's 1892 volume Sight and Song, which contains only ekphrastic poetry; Algernon Charles Swinburne's poem "Before the Mirror", which ekphrasizes James Abbott McNeill Whistler's Symphony in White, No. 2: The Little White Girl, hinted at only by the poem's subtitle, "Verses Written under a Picture"; and Robert Browning's "My Last Duchess", which although a dramatic monologue, includes some description by the duke of the portrait before which he and the listener stand.

Ekphrastic poetry is still commonly practiced. Twentieth-century examples include Rainer Maria Rilke's "Archaïscher Torso Apollos", and The Shield of Achilles (1952), a poem by W. H. Auden, which brings the tradition back to its start with an ironic retelling of the episode in Homer (see above), where Thetis finds very different scenes from those she expects. In contrast, his earlier poem "Musée des Beaux Arts" describes a particular real and famous painting, Landscape with the Fall of Icarus, thought until recently to be by Pieter Brueghel the Elder, and now believed to be "after" him, is also described in the poem by William Carlos Williams "Landscape with the Fall of Icarus".

The poet Gabriele Tinti has composed a series of poems for ancient works of art including the Boxer at Rest, the Discobolus, Arundel Head, the Ludovisi Gaul, the Victorious Youth, the Farnese Hercules, the Hercules by Scopas, the Elgin marbles from the Parthenon, the Barberini Faun, the Doryphoros and many other masterpieces.

In, or as, art history 

Since the types of objects described in classical ekphrases often lack survivors to modern times, art historians have often been tempted to use descriptions in literature as sources for the appearance of actual Greek or Roman art, an approach full of risk. This is because ekphrasis typically contains an element of competition with the art it describes, aiming to demonstrate the superior ability of words to "paint a picture". Many subjects of ekphrasis are clearly imaginary, for example those of the epics, but with others it remains uncertain the extent to which they were, or were expected to be by early audiences, at all accurate.

This tendency is not restricted to classical art history; the evocative but vague mentions of objects in metalwork in Beowulf are eventually always mentioned by writers on Anglo-Saxon art, and compared to the treasures of Sutton Hoo and the Staffordshire Hoard. The ekphrasic writings of the lawyer turned bishop Asterius of Amasea (fl. around 400) are often cited by art historians of the period to fill gaps in the surviving artistic record. The inadequacy of most medieval accounts of art is mentioned above; they generally lack any specific details other than cost and the owner or donor, and hyperbolic but wholly vague praise.

Journalistic art criticism was effectively invented by Denis Diderot in his long pieces on the works in the Paris Salon, and extended and highly pointed accounts of the major exhibitions of new art became a popular seasonal feature in the journalism of most Western countries. Since few if any of the works could be illustrated, description and evocation was necessary, and the criticality of descriptions of works disliked became a part of the style.

As art history began to become an academic subject in the 19th century, ekphrasis as formal analysis of objects was regarded as a vital component of the subject. Not all examples lack attractiveness as literature. Writers on art for a wider audience produced many descriptions with great literary as well as art historical merit; in English John Ruskin, both the most important journalistic critic and popularizer of historic art of his day, and Walter Pater, above all for his famous evocation of the Mona Lisa, are among the most notable. As photography in books or on television allowed audiences a direct visual comparison to the verbal description, the role of ekphrasic commentary on the images may have increased.

Ekphrasis has also been an influence on art; for example the ekphrasis of the Shield of Achilles in Homer and other classical examples are likely to have inspired the elaborately decorated large serving dishes in silver or silver-gilt, crowded with complicated scenes in relief, that were produced in 16th century Mannerist metalwork.

In music 

There are a number of examples of ekphrasis in music, of which the best known is probably Pictures at an Exhibition, a suite in ten movements (plus a recurring, varied Promenade) composed for piano by the Russian composer Modest Mussorgsky in 1874, and then very popular in various arrangements for orchestra. The suite is based on real pictures, although as the exhibition was dispersed, most are now unidentified.

The first movement of Three Places in New England by Charles Ives is an ekphrasis of the Robert Gould Shaw Memorial in Boston, sculpted by Augustus Saint-Gaudens. Ives also wrote a poem inspired by the sculpture as a companion piece to the music. Rachmaninoff's symphonic poem Isle of the Dead is a musical evocation of Böcklin's painting of the same name. King Crimson's song "The Night Watch", with lyrics written by Richard Palmer-James, is an ekphrasis on Rembrandt's painting The Night Watch.

Notional ekphrasis 

Notional ekphrasis may describe mental processes such as dreams, thoughts and whimsies of the imagination. It may also be one art describing or depicting another work of art which as yet is still in an inchoate state of creation, in that the work described may still be resting in the imagination of the artist before he has begun his creative work. The expression may also be applied to an art describing the origin of another art, how it came to be made and the circumstances of its being created. Finally it may describe an entirely imaginary and non-existing work of art, as though it were factual and existed in reality.

In ancient literature

Greek literature

The Iliad 

The shield of Achilles is described by Homer in anexample of ekphrastic poetry, used to depict events that have occurred in the past and events that will occur in the future. The shield contains images representative of the Cosmos and the inevitable fate of the city of Troy. The shield of Achilles features the following nine depictions:
 The Earth, Sea, Sky, Moon and the Cosmos (484–89)
 Two cities – one where a wedding and a trial are taking place, and one that is considered to be Troy, due to the battle occurring inside the city (509–40)
 A field that is being ploughed (541–49)
 The home of a King where the harvest is being reaped (550–60)
 A vineyard that is being harvested (561–72)
 A herd of cattle that is being attacked by two lions, while the Herdsman and his dogs try to scare the lions off the prize bull (573–86)
 A sheep farm (587–89)
 A scene with young men and women dancing (590–606)
 The mighty Ocean as it encircles the shield (607–609)

The Odyssey 

Although not written as elaborately as previous examples of ekphrastic poetry, from lines 609–614 the belt of Herakles is described as having "marvelous works," such as animals with piercing eyes and hogs in a grove of trees. It also contains multiple images of battles and occurrences of manslaughter. In the Odyssey, there is also a scene where Odysseus, disguised as a beggar, must prove to his wife, Penelope, that he has proof that Odysseus is still alive. She asks him about the clothes Odysseus was wearing during the time when the beggar claims he hosted Odysseus. Homer uses this opportunity to implement more ekphrastic imagery by describing the golden brooch of Odysseus, which depicts a hound strangling a fawn that it captured.

The Argonautika 

The Cloak of Jason is another example of ekphrastic poetry. In The Argonautika, Jason's cloak has seven events embroidered into it:

 The forging of Zeus' thunderbolts by the Cyclops (730-734)
 The building of Thebes by the sons of Antiope (735–741)
 Aphrodite with the shield of Ares (742–745)
 The battle between Teleboans and the Sons of Electryon (746–751)
 Pelops winning Hippodameia (752–758)
 Apollo punishing Tityos (759–762)
 Phrixus and the Ram (763–765)

The description of the cloak provides many examples of ekphrasis, and not only is modeled on Homer's writing, but alludes to several occurrences in Homer's epics the Iliad and the Odyssey. Jason's cloak can be examined in many ways. The way the cloak's events are described is similar to the catalogue of Women that Odysseus encounters on his trip to the Underworld.

The cloak and its depicted events lend more to the story than a simple description; in true ekphrasis fashion it not only compares Jason to future heroes such as Achilles and Odysseus, but also provides a type of foreshadowing. Jason, by donning the cloak, can be seen as a figure who would rather resort to coercion, making him a parallel to Odysseus, who uses schemes and lies to complete his voyage back to Ithaca.

Jason also bears similarities to Achilles: by donning the cloak, Jason is represented as an Achillean heroic figure due to the comparisons made between his cloak and the shield of Achilles. He also takes up a spear given to him by Atalanta, not as an afterthought, but due to his heroic nature and the comparison between himself and Achilles.

While Jason only wears the cloak while going to meet with Hypsipyle, it foreshadows the changes that Jason will potentially undergo during his adventure. Through the telling of the scenes on the cloak, Apollonios relates the scenes on the cloak as virtues and morals that should be upheld by the Roman people, and that Jason should learn to live by. Such virtues include the piety represented by the Cyclops during the forging of Zeus' thunderbolts. This is also reminiscent of the scene in the Iliad when Thetis goes to see Hephaestus, and requisitions him to create a new set of armor for her son Achilles. Before he began creating the shield and armor, Hephaestus was forging 20 golden tripods for his own hall, and in the scene on Jason's cloak we see the Cyclops performing the last step of creating the thunderbolts for Zeus.

Roman literature

The Aeneid 

The Aeneid is an epic that was written by Virgil during the reign of Augustus, the first Emperor of Rome. While the epic itself mimics Homer's works, it can be seen as propaganda for Augustus and the new Roman empire. The shield of Aeneas is described in book eight, from lines 629–719. This shield was given to him by his mother, Venus, after she asked her husband Vulcan to create it. This scene is almost identical to Thetis, the mother of Achilles, asking Hephaestus to create her son new weapons and armor for the battle of Troy.

The difference in the descriptions of the two shields are easily discernible; the shield of Achilles depicts many subjects, whereas the shield made for Aeneas depicts the future that Rome will have, containing propaganda in favor of the Emperor Augustus. Much like other ekphrastic poetry, it depicts a clear catalogue of events:

 The She Wolf and the suckling Romulus and Remus (629–634)
 The Rape of the Sabine Women (635–639)
 Mettius pulled apart by horses (640–645)
 Invasion of Lars Parsona (646–651)
 Manlius guarding the capitol (652–654)
 Gauls invading Rome (655–665)
 Tartarus with Cato and Catiline (666–670)
 The Sea around the width of the shield (671–674)
 The Battle of Actium (675–677)
 Augustus and Agrippa (678–684)
 Antony and Cleopatra (685–695)
 Triumph (696–719)

There is speculation as to why Virgil depicted certain events, while completely avoiding others such as Julius Caesar's conquest of Gaul. Virgil clearly outlined the shield chronologically, but scholars argue that the events on the shield are meant to reflect certain Roman values that would have been of high importance to the Roman people and to the Emperor. These values may include virtus, clementia, iustitia, and pietas, which were the values inscribed on a shield given to Augustus by the Senate. This instance of ekphrasitc poetry may be Virgil's attempt to relate more of his work to Augustus.

Earlier in the epic, when Aeneas travels to Carthage, he sees the temple of the city, and on it are great works of art that are described by the poet using the ekphrastic style. Like the other occurrences of ekphrasis, these works of art describe multiple events. Out of these, there are eight images related to the Trojan War:

 Depictions of Agamemnon and Menelaus, Priam and Achilles (459)
 Greeks running from Trojan soldiers (468)
 The sacking of the tents of Rhesus and the Thracians, and their deaths by Diomedes (468–472)
 Troilus being thrown from his Chariot as he flees from Achilles (473–478)
 The women of Troy in lamentation, praying to the gods to help them (479–482)
 Achilles selling Hektor's body (483–487)
 Priam begging for the return of his son, with the Trojan commanders nearby (483–488)
 Penthesilea the Amazon, and her fighters (489–493)

Another significant ekphrasis in the Aeneid appears on the baldric of Pallas (Aeneid X.495-505). The baldric is decorated with the murder of the sons of Aegyptus by their cousins, the Danaïds, a tale dramatized by Aeschylus. Pallas is killed by the warrior Turnus, who plunders and wears the baldric. At the climax of the poem, when Aeneas is on the point of sparing Turnus's life, the sight of the baldric changes the hero's mind. The significance of the ekphrasis is hotly debated.

The Metamorphoses 

There are several examples of ekphrasis in the Metamorphoses; one in which Phaeton journeys to the temple of the sun to meet his father Phoebus. When Phaeton gazes upon the temple of the sun, he sees the following carvings:
 The seas that circle the Earth, the surrounding lands, and the sky (8–9)
 The gods of the sea and the Nymphs (10–19)
 Scenes of men, beasts, and local gods (20–21)
 Twelve figures of the Zodiac, six on each side of the door to the temple (22–23)

Other aspects

Educational value of using ekphrasis in teaching literature 

The rationale behind using examples of ekphrasis to teach literature is that once the connection between a poem and a painting are recognized, for example, the student's emotional and intellectual engagement with the literary text is extended to new dimensions. The literary text takes on new meaning and there is more to respond to because another art form is being evaluated. In addition, as the material taught has both a visual and linguistic basis new connections of understanding are formed in the student's brain thus creating a stronger foundation for understanding, remembrance and internalization. Using ekphrasis to teach literature can be done through the use of higher order thinking skills such as distinguishing different perspectives, interpreting, inferring, sequencing, compare and contrast and evaluating.

Literature examples 
 Roberto E. Aras: "«Ecfrasis» y «sinfronismos» en la ruta de Ortega hacia El Quijote" ("Ekphrasis" and "synphronism" on Ortega's route to Don Quixote), in Disputatio. Philosophical Research Bulletin 8:10 (December 2019): 0-00 (18 p.) 
 Andrew Sprague Becker: The Shield of Achilles and the Poetics of Ekphrasis. Lanham, MD: Rowman & Littlefield, 1995. 
 Emilie Bergman: Art Inscribed: Essays on Ekphrasis in Spanish Golden Age Poetry. Cambridge: Harvard University Press, 1979. 
 Gottfried Boehm and Helmut Pfotenhauer: Beschreibungskunst, Kunstbeschreibung: Ekphrasis von der Antike bis zur Gegenwart. München: W. Fink, 1995. 
 Siglind Bruhn: Musical Ekphrasis: Composers Responding to Poetry and Painting. Hillsdale, NY: Pendragon Press, 2000. 
 Siglind Bruhn: Musical Ekphrasis in Rilke's Marienleben. Amsterdam/Atlanta: Rodopi Publishers, 2000. 
 Siglind Bruhn: "A Concert of Paintings: 'Musical Ekphrasis' in the Twentieth Century," in Poetics Today 22:3 (Herbst 2001): 551–605. ISSN 0333-5372
 Siglind Bruhn: Das tönende Museum: Musik interpretiert Werke bildender Kunst. Waldkirch: Gorz, 2004. 
 Siglind Bruhn: "Vers une méthodologie de l'ekphrasis musical," in Sens et signification en musique, ed. by Márta Grabócz and Danièle Piston. Paris: Hermann, 2007, 155–176. 
 Siglind Bruhn, ed.: Sonic Transformations of Literary Texts: From Program Music to Musical Ekphrasis [Interplay: Music in Interdisciplinary Dialogue, vol. 6]. Hillsdale, NY: Pendragon Press, 2008. 
Frederick A. de Armas: Ekphrasis in the Age of Cervantes. Lewisburg: Bucknell University Press, 2005. 
 Frederick A. de Armas: Quixotic Frescoes: Cervantes and Italian Renaissance Art. Toronto: University of Toronto Press, 2006. 
 Robert D. Denham: Poets on Paintings: A Bibliography. (Jefferson, NC: McFarland, 2010) 
 Hermann Diels: . Berlin, G. Reimer, 1917.
  Barbara K Fischer: Museum Mediations: Reframing Ekphrasis in Contemporary American Poetry. New York: Routledge, 2006. 
 Claude Gandelman: Reading Pictures, Viewing Texts. Bloomington: Indiana University Press, 1991. 
 Jean H. Hagstrum: The Sister Arts: The Tradtition of Literary Pictorialism and English Poetry from Dryden to Gray. Chicago: The University of Chicago Press, 1958.
 James Heffernan: Museum of Words: The Poetics of Ekphrasis from Homer to Ashbery. Chicago: University of Chicago Press, 1993. 
 John Hollander: The Gazer's Spirit: Poems Speaking to Silent Works of Art. Chicago: University of Chicago Press, 1995. 
 Gayana Jurkevich: In pursuit of the natural sign: Azorín and the poetics of Ekphrasis. Lewisburg, PA: Bucknell University Press, 1999. 
 Mario Klarer: Ekphrasis: Bildbeschreibung als Repräsentationstheorie bei Spenser, Sidney, Lyly und Shakespeare. Tübingen: Niemeyer, 2001. 
 Gisbert Kranz: Das Bildgedicht: Theorie, Lexikon, Bibliographie, 3 Bände. Köln: Böhlau, 1981–87. 
 Gisbert Kranz: Meisterwerke in Bildgedichten: Rezeption von Kunst in der Poesie. Frankfurt: Peter Lang, 1986. 
 Gisbert Kranz: Das Architekturgedicht. Köln: Böhlau, 1988. 
 Gisbert Kranz: Das Bildgedicht in Europa: Zur Theorie und Geschichte einer literarischen Gattung. Paderborn: Schöningh, 1973. 
 Murray Krieger: Ekphrasis: The Illusion of the Natural Sign. Baltimore: Johns Hopkins University Press, 1992. 
 Norman Land: The Viewer as Poet: The Renaissance Response to Art. University Park, PA: Pennsylvania State University Press, 1994. 
 Cecilia Lindhé, 'Bildseendet föds i fingertopparna'. Om en ekfras för den digitala tidsålder, Ekfrase. Nordisk tidskrift för visuell kultur, 2010:1, p. 4–16. ISSN Online: 1891-5760 ISSN Print: 1891-5752
 Hans Lund: Text as Picture: Studies in the Literary Transformation of Pictures. Lewiston, NY: E. Mellen Press, 1992 (originally published in Swedish as Texten som tavla, Lund 1982). 
 Alexander Medvedev: Tiziano’s «Denarius of Caesar» and F.M. Dostoevsky’s «The Grand Inquisitor»: on the Problem of Christian Art In: The Solovyov Research, 2011, No. 3, (31). P. 79–90.
 Michaela J. Marek: Ekphrasis und Herrscherallegorie: Antike Bildbeschreibungen im Werk Tizians und Leonardos. Worms: Werner'sche Verlagsgesellschaft, 1985. 
 J. D. McClatchy: Poets on Painters: Essays on the Art of Painting by Twentieth-Century Poets. Berkeley: University of California Press, 1988. 
 Hugo Méndez-Ramírez: Neruda's Ekphrastic Experience: Mural Art and Canto general. Lewisburg, PA: Bucknell University Press, 1999. 
Richard Meek: Narrating the Visual in Shakespeare. Burlington, VT: Ashgate Publishing, 2009. 
 W.J.T. Mitchell: Picture Theory: Essays on Verbal and Visual Representation. Chicago: University of Chicago Press, 1994. 
 Margaret Helen Persin: Getting the Picture: The Ekphrastic Principle in Twentieth-century Spanish Poetry. Lewisburg, PA: Bucknell University Press, 1997. 
 Michael C J Putnam: Virgil's Epic Designs: Ekphrasis in the Aeneid. New Haven: Yale University Press, 1998. 
 Christine Ratkowitsch: Die poetische Ekphrasis von Kunstwerken: eine literarische Tradition der Grossdichtung in Antike, Mittelalter und früher Neuzeit. Wien: Verlag der Österreichischen Akademie der Wissenschaften, 2006. 
 Valerie Robillard and Els Jongeneel (eds.): Pictures into Words: Theoretical and Descriptive Approaches to Ekphrasis. Amsterdam: VU University Press, 1998. 
 Maria Rubins: Crossroad of Arts, Crossroad of Cultures: Ekphrasis in Russian and French Poetry. New York: Palgrave, 2000. 
 Grant F. Scott: The Sculpted Word: Keats, Ekphrasis, and the Visual Arts. Hanover, NH: University Press of New England, 1994. 
 Grant F. Scott: "Ekphrasis and the Picture Gallery", in Advances in Visual Semiotics. Ed. Thomas A. Sebeok and Jean Umiker-Sebeok. New York and Berlin: W. de Gruyter, 1995. 403–421.
 Grant F. Scott: "Copied with a Difference: Ekphrasis in William Carlos Williams' Pictures from Brueghel". Word & Image 15 (January–March 1999): 63–75.
 Mack Smith: Literary Realism and the Ekphrastic Tradition. University Park: Pennsylvania State U Press, 1995. 
 Leo Spitzer: "The 'Ode on a Grecian Urn', or Content vs. Metagrammar," in Comparative Literature 7. Eugene, OR: University of Oregon Press, 1955, 203–225.
Ryan J. Stark, Rhetoric, Science, and Magic in Seventeenth-Century England (Washington, DC: The Catholic University of America Press, 2009), 181–90.
 Iman Tavassoly: Rumi in Manhattan: An Ekphrastic Collection of Poetry and Photography, 2018. 
 Peter Wagner: Icons, Texts, Iconotexts: Essays on Ekphrasis and Intermediality. Berlin, New York: W. de Gruyter, 1996. 
 Haiko Wandhoff: Ekphrasis: Kunstbeschreibungen und virtuelle Räume in der Literatur des Mittelalters. Berlin, New York: De Gruyter, 2003. 
 Robert Wynne: Imaginary Ekphrasis. Columbus, OH: Pudding House Publications, 2005. 
 Tamar Yacobi, "The Ekphrastic Figure of Speech," in Martin Heusser et al. (eds.), Text and Visuality. Word and Image Interactions 3, Amsterdam: Rodopi, 1999, .
 Tamar Yacobi, "Verbal Frames and Ekphrastic Figuration," in Ulla-Britta Lagerroth, Hans Lund and Erik Hedling (eds.), Interart Poetics. Essays on the Interrelations of the Arts and Media, Amsterdam: Rodopi, 1997, .

See also 
 Blazon
 Phocas's Ecphrasis, a medieval itinerary of the Holy Land

References

External links 
Discussion of Form
Essay on musical ekphrasis 
Maier Museum of Art at Randolph College Ekphrastic Poetry Web Page
Hephaestus Starts Achilles' Shield
Self-Portrait in a Convex Mirror, Ashbery
Ekphrastic poem by Jared Carter on the Lorado Taft sculpture, "The Solitude of the Soul."

Rhetorical techniques
Visual arts theory
Figures of speech
Works based on art